Zapotillo is a corregimiento in Las Palmas District, Veraguas Province, Panama with a population of 69 as of 2010. Its population as of 1990 was 69; its population as of 2000 was 69.

References

Corregimientos of Veraguas Province